Ann Wild OBE is a retired British wheelchair basketball player.

She was part of Great Britain's women's wheelchair basketball team at the 1988, 1996, 2000, 2004 and 2008 Summer Paralympics.

After retiring from basketball, Wild attempted to qualify for 2012 Summer Paralympics in London in shooting, but narrowly missed out on selection for the team.

In June 2010, Wild was awarded the OBE for services to wheelchair basketball.

Wild appeared in the Paralympic special edition of Channel 4's show Come Dine with Me. She also provided expert analysis for Channel 4's coverage of the women's wheelchair basketball tournament at the 2012 Summer Paralympics in London.

Wild is a professionally qualified Occupational Therapist and has returned to wheelchair basketball as a coach.

References

External links
 
 

British women's wheelchair basketball players
Paralympic wheelchair basketball players of Great Britain
Wheelchair basketball players at the 1988 Summer Paralympics
Wheelchair basketball players at the 1996 Summer Paralympics
Wheelchair basketball players at the 2000 Summer Paralympics
Wheelchair basketball players at the 2004 Summer Paralympics
Wheelchair basketball players at the 2008 Summer Paralympics
Wheelchair category Paralympic competitors

Point guards
Officers of the Order of the British Empire

Living people

Year of birth missing (living people)